The first banknotes used in the archipelago that would become Indonesia were that issued by the United East India Company, credit letters of the rijksdaalder dating between 1783 and 1811. Netherlands Indies gulden government credit paper followed in 1815, and from 1827 to 1842 and again from 1866 to 1948 gulden notes of De Javasche Bank. Lower denominations (below 5 gulden) were issued by the government in 1919–1920 and in 1939–1940 due to wartime metal shortages, but otherwise day-to-day transactions were conducted using coinage.

Gulden notes were issued by "The Japanese Government" during the Japanese occupation of the Dutch East Indies from 1942, becoming "roepiah" in 1943.

The first truly Indonesian rupiah notes, however were issued in 1946, during the war of independence with the Dutch, following the unilateral proclamation of independence by the Indonesians at the end of World War II on 17 August 1945. This money is known as Oeang Republik Indonesia (ORI; oeang being the old spelling of uang, in English "money").

Following the negotiated peace treaty in The Hague of 1949, the ORI was withdrawn, and replaced by an internationally recognised Indonesian rupiah.

The Indonesian rupiah has been subject to numerous devaluations, and in 1965 existing paper was withdrawn and replaced by a new rupiah at the rate of 1,000 to 1.

Money around independence year

First series (1945) 
The first 'Indonesian rupiah' bank notes bore the date of the proclamation on new Indonesian money, 17 October 1945, under the authority of the "Republik Indonesia", and were apparently intended for issue on 1 February 1946, but due to the capture of most of the notes, only a tiny number escaped at this time.

The circulation began in earnest in Java from 10 October 1946. The notes were in denominations of Rp0.01, Rp0.05, Rp0.10, Rp, Rp1, Rp5, Rp10, and Rp100.

Second series (1 January 1947) 

The second series of money now emanated from 'Djokjakarta', the Republic's base following the 'Police Action' of 21 July 1947, which had confined the Republicans to Yogyakarta and Central Java. The notes were dated 1 January 1947, in denominations of Rp5, Rp10, Rp25, and Rp100.

Third series (26 July 1947) 

The next new issue was dated 26 July 1947, and consisted of Rp, Rp, Rp25, Rp50, Rp100, and Rp250 notes.

Fourth series (23 August 1948) 

New notes were issued by the national government in 1948, in the bizarre denominations of Rp40, Rp75, Rp100, and Rp400, plus an unissued Rp600 note.

On 19 December 1948, the Dutch seized Yogyakarta, reverting the head office of the then-Republic's central bank Bank Negara Indonesia back to De Javasche Bank, with DJB offices also reopened in Surakarta and Kediri.

It was planned in 1949 to revalue the national rupiah notes of the republic (which were at this time circulating in Java). To do this, "rupiah baru" ('new rupiah') notes were printed. This revaluation did not take place in Java, but some were issued in Aceh instead. The denominations printed were Rp0.10 sen (blue or red), Rp (green or red), Rp1 (purple or green), Rp10 (black or brown), Rp25, and Rp100.

Regional Issues 

In addition to the 'national' (but restricted in practice to the central republican enclave in Java) notes, the republican authorities, to discourage the circulation of Dutch money, instructed regional commanders in areas that the national money couldn't reach, to issue their own money, to be unified after full independence.

Java 

The notes issued in Java generally featured text, a signature, and a serial number, all issued on low-grade paper without modern security features such as watermarks, and demonstrated few similarities between areas. Only in a few areas did the notes have any pictures on them. The following notes are known to have been printed:
 Rp1 and Rp5 notes of "Daerah Kota Blitar" (Blitar, East Java; dated 6 August 1948)
 Rp, Rp1, Rp5, and Rp10 notes of "Daerah Bodjonegoro" (Bojonegoro, East Java; dated 15 November 1948)
 Rp, Rp5 and Rp10 notes of 'Dearah Istimewa Jogjakarta' (the Special Region of Yogyakarta; dated 10 November 1948)
 Rp5 notes of 'Kota Kediri' (Kediri, East Java; dated 5 August 1948)
 Rp, Rp5 and Rp10 notes of 'Daerah Karesidenan Kediri' (Kediri Residency; dated 16 October 1948)
 Rp1, Rp, Rp5, Rp10 notes of 'Daerah Kota Madiun' (Madiun, East Java; dated 1 September 1948)
 Rp and Rp5 notes of Magelang Residency, Central Java (dated 1 August 1948 and 25 October 1948)
 Rp1, Rp, Rp5 and Rp10 notes of Magetan Residency, East Java (dated 17 September 1948)
 Rp, Rp1, Rp5 and Rp10 notes of Patjitan Residency, East Java (dated 1948)
 Rp1, Rp5, Rp10, Rp25 and Rp50 notes of Serang, Banten Residency, West Java (dated 15 December 1947)
 Rp1, Rp and Rp5 notes (dated 1 November 1948) and Rp5, Rp10 and Rp25 notes (dated 1 November 1949) of Surakarta Residency, Central Java  
 Rp5 notes of Cepu region (dated 17 August 1948)

Rp25 note of Banten Residency, 15 December 1947

Sumatra 
As with the Java notes, the Sumatran notes are all primitive, lacking security features and printed on poor-quality paper. In most cases, they have some kind of artwork. The following notes are known to have been printed:
 Rp1, Rp5, Rp10 and Rp100 notes of Pematang Siantar, Sumatra province (dated 31 March 1947)
 Rp50, Rp100, Rp250, Rp500 and Rp1000 notes of Bengkulu Residency (dated 1 June 1947)
 Rp50, Rp100, Rp250, Rp500, Rp1000 notes of Palembang Defence Council, South Sumatra (dated 1 August 1947)
 Rp5, Rp50, Rp100 and Rp250 notes of Serbalawan, Simalungun, North Sumatra (dated 5 August 1947)
 Rp5, Rp10, Rp25, Rp50, Rp100, and Rp200 notes of Tapanuli Residency (dated 8 August 1947, 8 September 1947, 18 November 1947, 28 April 1948, 11 October 1948, and 23 November 1948 respectively)
 Rp0.10, Rp0.50, Rp1, Rp, Rp5, Rp10, Rp25, Rp50, Rp100, Rp2,500 and Rp100,000 notes (all dated 21 August 1947), of Asahan Regency North Sumatra, plus Rp1,000, Rp2,500 and Rp100,000 notes (dated 7 February 1948), a Rp 2,000,000 rupiah note (dated 1 and 2 April 1948), a Rp100,000 note (dated "May" 1948), and a Rp250,000 note (dated "April" and "12 April" 1948)
 Rp50 and Rp100 notes Limapuluh district, North Sumatra (dated 1 September 1947)
 Rp50 and Rp100 notes of Kualuh Leidong, North Labuhan Batu Regency, North Sumatra (dated 1 September 1947), plus a Rp250 note (dated October 1947), a Rp1,000 note (dated 10 December 1947), a Rp2,500 note (dated 1 January 1948), a Rp5,000 rupiah (dated 13 January 1948), a Rp10,000 note (dated 20 January 1948 and 10 February 1948), a Rp250,000 note (dated 15 February 1948), a Rp25,000 note (dated 22 February 1948), a Rp50,000 note (dated 3 March 1948), a Rp10,000,000 note (dated 15 April 1948), and a Rp25,000,000 note (dated 3 May 1948)
 Rp0.50, Rp1, and Rp2.50 notes of Banda Aceh, "Aceh residency" (dated 15 September 1947), plus Rp and Rp5 notes (dated 1 December 1947) and Rp5 and Rp10 notes (dated 15 January 1948)
 Rp, Rp5, Rp50, Rp100 and Rp500 notes of Labuhan Batu Regency, Rantau Prapat, North Sumatra (1947), plus Rp100, Rp1,000 and Rp2,500 notes (dated 29 November 1947) Rp 5,000 and Rp10,000 notes (January/February 1948), a Rp25,000 note (February 1948), a Rp50,000 note (February/March 1948), a Rp250,000 note (March/April 1948), and Rp5,000,000 and Rp25,000,000 notes (April/May 1948)
 Rp50 note of Karo Regency, Tigabinangga (dated 17 September 1947), and Rp100, Rp250 and Rp1,000 notes (dated 20 November 1947)
 Rp1 note of Jambi Residency, East Sumatra (dated 17 September 1947), plus  Rp and Rp notes (dated 24 October 1947 and 28 November 1947), Rp5 and Rp10 notes (dated 17 November 1947), Rp, Rp5 and Rp10 notes (dated 27 December 1947), Rp1, Rp5 and Rp10 notes (dated 31 March 1948), a Rp1 note (dated 1 April 1948), and Rp, Rp5 and Rp25 notes (dated 20 May 1948)
 Rp1 note of Nias (dated 25 September 1947), plus Rp100 and Rp200 notes (dated 20 December 1948) and a Rp500 note (dated 5 January 1949 and 12 November 1949)
 Rp1, Rp5 and Rp10 notes of Bengkulu, South Sumatra (dated 1 December 1947)
 Rp10, 50, Rp100, Rp250 and Rp1,000 rupiah of Pagar Alam, South Sumatra (dated 17 December 1947)
 Rp10 and Rp25 notes of Labuhan Bilik (dated 23 December 1947), plus a Rp100 note (dated January/February 1948), Rp10,000 and Rp100,000 notes (dated 24 February 1948), Rp50,000 (dated 6 March 1948), a Rp250,000 note (dated 25 March 1948), a Rp500,000 note (dated 9 April 1948), and a Rp25,000,000 note (dated 7 May 1948)
 Rp500 note of Barus, Central Tapanuli Regency (dated 26 December 1947)
 Rp25 Japanese rupiah of Tandjungkarang, Lampung Residency, Sumatra (dated 15 November 1947), plus Rp50 and Rp100 rupiah notes (dated 15 January 1948)
 Rp, Rp1, Rp, Rp5 and Rp10 notes of Lampung Residency, Sumatra (dated 1 June 1948)
 Rp1, Rp5 and Rp10 notes of Kutacane (1948)
 Rp10 and Rp50 notes of Koetabumi, North Lampung, Sumatra (1949)
 Rp100 and Rp250 notes of Langsa, East Aceh (2 January 1949)
 Rp10 and Rp25 notes of Lintang IV Lawang, Lahat Regency, South Sumatra (dated 17 January 1949)
 Rp10 notes of Palembang Residency (dated 17 January 1949), plus a Rp50 note (dated 17 April 1949) a Rp40 note (dated 6 July 1949), and a Rp50 note (18 November 1949)
 Rp250 notes of Kutaradja, North Sumatra (dated 1 March 1949)
 Rp25 and Rp50 notes of South Pesisir, West Sumatra (dated 1949)
 Rp20 notes of the South Sumatra Special Military Region (Bukit Barisan) (dated 1 May 1949)
 Rp40 of Tjurup, Rejang Lebong Regency South Sumatra (dated 1949)

The following notes were all issued by the "Governor of Sumatra" in Bukittinggi:
 Rp, Rp1, Rp, Rp5, Rp10 and Rp25 rupiah of "Sumatra Province" (dated 17 August 1947), plus a Rp note (dated 17 December 1947), Rp1, Rp5 and Rp10 notes (dated 1 January 1948), a Rp25 note (dated 17 January 1948), Rp5, Rp10, Rp25 and Rp50 notes (dated 1 April 1948), and a Rp100 note (dated 17 April 1948)
 Rp10 for Jambi (17 December 1947)
 Rp5 rupiah for Riau (17 December 1947)
 Rp1, Rp, Rp5 and Rp10 for South Sumatra (1 January 1948)
 Rp5 for East Sumatra (1 January 1948)
 Rp10 and Rp25 notes for Aceh (1 January 1948)
 Rp5 for Tapanuli, Northwest Sumatra (1 January 1948)
 Rp10 for West Sumatra (17 January 1948)

Rp10 note of "Sumatra Province" (dated 1 January 1948)

Rp500 note of Bengkulu Residency (dated 1 June 1947)

Rp1,000 note of Bengkulu Residency (dated 1 June 1947)

1950 onwards: Indonesian independence recognised

Gulden/roepiah notes (1950-1952)

Low denomination notes 

The Dutch treasury had in 1947 issued Indonesian language Rp0.10 and Rp0.25 notes. Due to the initial lack of coinage and due to their relatively republic-friendly design, the Indonesian government saw it as expedient to continue to print these notes, and authorised their issue until such time as coinage had been minted, and in sufficient quantity to replace them.

De Javasche Bank notes 

The peace settlement with the Dutch, negotiated in The Hague in November 1949, had kept De Javasche Bank as the central bank in Indonesia, hence the first notes that were issued for the post-independence rupiah bore its imprint. It was decided that the existing De Javasche Bank money dated 1946 would simply be revised in colour, with the 5 gulden note changing from purple to red and green, the 10 gulden from green to purple, and 25 gulden from red to green. In addition, 50 gulden, 100 gulden, 500 gulden, and 1,000 gulden notes were added, still dated 1946.

Because there were existing Rp0.10 and Rp0.25 notes (which remained as legal tender and continued to be printed), a gap existed between the Rp0.25 Indonesia and 5 gulden De Javasche Bank notes. This was filled with of Rp, Rp1, and Rp notes, all dated 1948. The notes in wording were similar to the notes of 5 gulden and up, but the Indonesian text ('roepiah') placed above Dutch ('gulden').

The notes were all printed by Johan Enschede en Zonen based in the Netherlands.

Republik Indonesia Serikat notes (1950) 
The "Republik Indonesia Serikat" passed legislation on 2 June 1950 to allow it to issue new treasury notes, which were dated 1 January 1950 in denominations of Rp5 and Rp10. This was not long-lasting, as the RIS dissolved on 17 August 1950 (5 years after the original declaration of independence).

The notes were printed by Thomas De La Rue of England and had the date "1 January 1950" printed on the note.

Nationalisation of De Javasche Bank: first Republik Indonesia banknotes (1951-1953) 

With the nationalisation of De Javasche Bank via the Emergency Act of 1951, it was decreed that the government would be able to issue notes of Rp1 and Rp2½ denominations. Thus, 'Republik Indonesia' notes dated 1951 were issued in Rp1 and Rp2½ denominations.

Formation of Bank Indonesia from De Javasche Bank: second Republik Indonesia banknotes (1953-1965) 

The transformation from DJB to Bank Indonesia (BI) occurred after the Emergency Act of 1951 was renewed as the Currency Act of 1953, and the 1951-issue 1 and 2½ rupiah government notes were reissued with the signature of the new Minister of Finance dated 1953.

First series of Bank Indonesia notes (1953-1954) 

Notes featuring the new name of the nationalised De Javasche bank – 'Bank Indonesia' – were prepared dated 1952, in denominations of Rp5, Rp10, Rp25, Rp50, Rp100, Rp500, and Rp1,000, signed by Indra Kasoema as Director, and Sjafruddin Prawiranegara as Governor. The notes began circulating from July 1953 to November 1954 depending on denomination.

Despite the new notes, which meant that paper bearing the name of DJB was no longer printed, the DJB notes dated '1946', and in fact circulating since 1950, remained legal tender right up to the 'new rupiah' of 1965 (which invalidated ALL previous money at that point), although some old DJB notes were repealed, as follows:
 2 March 1956: 1000 gulden '1946' note dating from 1950 withdrawn, effective 5 March 1959, due to rampant counterfeiting.
 22 November 1957: Rp1 and Rp2½ '1948' DJB notes withdrawn, effective 1 December 1957, because these denominations of notes were the issuing privilege of the government under the 1914 Currency Act in force at the time of their issue, and hence De Javasche Bank had lacked the authority for their issue.

The few Netherlands Indies government notes (all low denomination) still legal tender were repealed as follows:
 1 January 1954: all "Nederlandsch Indie" government money withdrawn: 1/2, 1, and 2½ gulden notes, all dating from early World War 2, 1940
 1 January 1957: Rp0.10 and Rp0.25 "Indonesia" "1947" notes withdrawn (these were also issued by the Republic of Indonesia)

1954 brought a redesign of the Indonesian government Rp1 and Rp2½ notes, which were re-dated with the new Minister of Finance's signature in 1956.

Second "Animals" series of Bank Indonesia banknotes (1958-1959) 
In 1957, governor of Bank Indonesia Sjafruddin Prawiranegara commissioned a new series of notes from English printer, Thomas De La Rue & Co. However, Syafruddin's involvement with PRRI meant that he was replaced in January 1958 as governor by Loekman Hakim. Specimens were produced in denominations of Rp5, Rp10, Rp25, Rp50, Rp100, Rp500, Rp1,000, and Rp5,000, and the first of these to be brought into circulation were the Rp100 and Rp1,000 notes, in 1958, due to the counterfeiting of these denominations of the 1952 series (the counterfeit notes can be distinguished by the wavy line watermark being printed onto the paper rather than a true watermark).

The issue of the notes was interrupted somewhat by a devaluation of 24 August 1959, with Rp500 (tiger) and Rp1,000 (elephant) notes devalued to Rp50 (crocodile) and Rp100 (squirrel) in September 1959. The Rp2,500 and Rp5,000 notes were deemed unnecessary thanks to the devaluation. The Rp2,500 rupiah note was eventually issued three years later due to continued high inflation, while the Rp5,000 note was never issued. The Rp10 and Rp25 notes were only circulated for 3 days, although they remained legal tender, and are today extremely rare.

In addition to the 8 notes designed, Loekman commissioned a new Rp2,500 note. Apart from the Rp100 and Rp1,000 notes, the remaining high denomination note, the Rp500, was released on 6 January 1959.

First Indonesian-designed notes, the "handicrafts" series (1959) 

8 September 1959 brought the first purely Indonesian-designed notes, issued by the state printer Pertjetakan Kebajoran. Notes issued are worth Rp5 and Rp100 (see full "handicrafts" section below for full details).

Thomas De La Rue flowers and birds banknotes (1960) 

Yet another series of notes, the 'flowers' series was issued by Bank Indonesia in 1960 (showing flowers on the obverse and birds on the reverse), and dated 1 January 1959, but issued in 1960. These notes were printed by Thomas De La Rue & Co. Ltd., England.

New design for government banknotes (1960-1961) 

A new design for the Rp1 and Rp2½ government notes was issued in 1960 showing agricultural workers, also re-dated with the new Minister of Finance's signature 1961.

Complete handicrafts series (1961-1964) 

The Bank Indonesia-printed handicrafts series replaced the TDLR notes in 1961 and 1962, with denominations from Rp5 to Rp1,000 being issued. The first Rp10,000 banknote was introduced in 1964.

Due to inflation, the TDLR Rp2,500 note of "animals" design was last issued in September 1962, becoming then the top denomination. A further response to inflation came with the issue of a 1958-dated Rp5,000 (brown) note in October 1963. By August 1964, it was necessary to add a Rp10,000 note (red), and dated "1964," completing the manual workers series.

Updates to the crafts notes (1965) 

In 1965, amid soaring inflation, all of the notes, with the exception of the bottom Rp5 and the Rp500 note of the handicrafts series, were revised and re-issued, some more than once.

"New rupiah" (1965-present)

First series ("Sukarno"; 1965-1967) 
The hyperinflation of the early 1960s resulted in the pronouncement of the "new rupiah" supposedly worth Rp1,000 of the old rupiah.

The withdrawal of the old money meant the issue of an entirely new set of banknotes by Presidential Decree of 13 December 1965. The decree authorised Bank Indonesia to issue fractional notes for the first time (although the Rp1 and Rp2½ notes were still issued by the government itself), in denominations of Rp0.1, Rp0.5, Rp0.10, Rp0.25, and Rp0.50 showing "volunteers" (Sukarelawan), dated 1964. Because the rupiah was only devalued by about 10, rather than 1000 times, they were worthless on issue, and thus millions of notes never entered circulation.

The remaining notes all featured President Sukarno on the obverse, and various dancers on the reverse; this series was issued by 'Republik Indonesia' in Rp1 and Rp2½, dated 1964, and Bank Indonesia dated 1960, in Rp5, Rp10, Rp25, Rp50, and Rp100 were issued ('1960'-dated Bank Indonesia notes of Rp5, Rp10, and Rp100 rupiah were already circulating in Irian Barat and Riau, along with '1961'-dated 'Republik Indonesia notes of Rp1 and Rp2½ in those same places); the notes from Rp500 to Rp10,000 were deemed unnecessary due to the devaluation.

To complete the devaluation, older notes (largely worthless by this point) were withdrawn over 1965–1966.

By 1967, due to the limited nature of the devaluation, it had proved necessary to add Rp500 and Rp1,000 rupiah notes, in the same design.

Second series ("Sudirman"; 1968-1970) 
By 1968 the Suharto New Order had been established, and Bank Indonesia, as of 1968 was given sole right to issue banknotes (including notes below 5 rupiah) as well as coins (which had previously been the issue of the central government).

Hence, the new issue of Rp1 to Rp1,000 banknotes, dated 1968, were all emanating from Bank Indonesia. The notes featured the revolutionary hero General Sudirman, backed by various scenes of industry. The notes were issued in 1968 and 1969. In 1970, notes of the same theme (but a different watermark) were added in Rp5,000 and Rp10,000 denominations, thus restoring notes to the same denominations that had been circulating prior the 1965 devaluation.

Diponegoro series (unissued) 
A new series of notes, which now started only at Rp100 (then US$0.24), was designed with a Diponegoro theme in 1971 (but undated); however, this series was never issued, although the Rp1,000 note, with date added, was issued in 1976 (see below), and the reverse of the Rp5,000 note was also used for the 1976 Rp5,000 note, but with a new obverse design.

This aborted note series was the last in Indonesia to have a consistent theme, although new notes typically retained the same colour as old ones of the same denomination.

Third series (1976-1978) 
Due to counterfeiting of the Sudirman notes, the Rp1,000, Rp5,000 and Rp10,000 notes were all re-designed, dated 1975, and issued in 1976. The Sudirman notes of Rp1,000 and above were withdrawn as legal tender as of 1 September 1977.

Redesigns of the Rp100 and Rp500 notes followed in 1978, thereby completing the third series of notes to be issued since the 1965 devaluation.

Fourth series (1979-1982) 

The first note to be replaced was again the top 10,000 rupiah note (by then worth approximately US$16), in 1979. Further redesigned notes followed in all denominations except the 100 rupiah, in 1980 and 1982.

Fifth series (1985–1988) 

The Rp100 note dating from 1977 was finally replaced in 1985; replacement notes of all denominations followed in 1985, 1987 and 1988.

Sixth series (1992) 
28 December 1992 saw a complete overhaul of all denominations of notes for the first time since 1968. In addition, a new top denomination, Rp20,000 note was added, with a US$ value of approximately $10 at the time. This was the first new denomination of the 'new rupiah' since the Rp10,000 had been issued in April 1970 (then worth about US$26). From this issue forwards, Indonesian notes have carried in small text in the note border the year of printing; the most conspicuous date on the note is still the date of authority (e.g., "Direksi 1992").

Suharto Rp50,000 paper note (1993) 
In 1993 a Rp50,000 (approx US$22) note celebrating "25 Years of Development" was issued. The design featured Suharto on the front and Soekarno-Hatta airport on the back, with a plane taking off to symbolise Indonesia's growth. The note (regular) were printed in 1993 and 1994. A polymer version intended as collectables were also issued (see Commemorative banknotes).

Addition of security thread (1995) 

1995 saw the introduction of the security thread to Indonesian banknotes, a feature on all large (Rp10,000 and above) notes of "Direksi 1995" and newer. The 1992 Rp20,000 notes and 1993 paper Rp50,000 notes were the affected notes.

Updates to high denominations, introduction of the Rp100,000 note (1998-1999) 
The Rp10,000, Rp20,000 and Rp50,000 notes were replaced in 1998 and 1999. A new polymer Rp100,000 rupiah note (by then only worth about US$10) was also added, imported from Australia. These notes, which were no longer printed following the introduction of new designs in 2004–2005, are no longer legal tender since 31 December 2008, although they remained exchangeable at Bank Indonesia offices until 30 December 2018.

Current series

2000-2014 series and introduction of Rp2000 

The lower denominations, Rp1,000 and Rp5,000, were updated in 2000 and 2001. While the Rp5,000 note is still being printed, the Rp1,000 note was last issued dated 2013 (later limited number of notes dated 2016 were issued) and, while remaining in circulation, has largely been replaced by a coin of the same value. Notes of the previous lowest denominations, Rp100 and Rp500, are no longer printed, since the rupiah had fallen in value by 80% since the previous issue of these denominations in 1992.

The Rp10,000 to Rp100,000 notes were replaced in 2004 and 2005, with the Rp100,000 note reverting to a locally printed paper design, as the polymer notes proved difficult for bank machines to count; all the notes were given better anti-forgery devices.

After several delays, following an initial announcement that the Rp2,000 note would replace the Rp1,000 note as the lowest denomination, the new denomination, Rp2,000, was finally officially released, to circulate alongside the lower denomination, on 9 July 2009.

On 20 July 2010, the 2005 issue Rp10,000 note was revised, featuring the same theme but with a colour change to better distinguish it from the Rp100,000 note. Several changes were also made to the note's security features and devices.

On 28 October 2011, in commemoration of Youth Pledge Day, Bank Indonesia issued newly designed banknotes denominated in Rp20,000, Rp50,000, and Rp100,000, although they bear no special commemorative text or images. The new notes have enhanced security features including rainbow printing and new codes for the sight impaired.

Bank Indonesia issued a revised Rp100,000 note on Independence Day, 17 August 2014. The banknotes have "Negara Kesatuan Republik Indonesia" ("The Unitary State of the Republic of Indonesia") written on the notes, replacing the name of its current issuer, Bank Indonesia. The new notes retain the images of its national figures and have more golden colors. It was purposely designed to make counterfeit harder. The revised note carries an imprint of TE. (abbreviation of "Tahun Emisi", Issue Year) 2014 and the signatures of the then-BI governor Agus Martowardojo and the then-Indonesian Finance Minister Chatib Basri. In addition, President Susilo Bambang Yudhoyono has officially appointed Sukarno and Mohammad Hatta as obverse of Rp100,000 banknotes, following the issuance of Presidential Decree No. 22 of 2 June 2014.

2016 series 
Bank Indonesia introduced a new series of banknotes on 19 December 2016 in denominations of Rp1,000, Rp2,000, Rp5,000, Rp10,000, Rp20,000, Rp50,000 and Rp100,000. This series features national heroes from the history of Indonesia.

2022 series 
Bank Indonesia introduced a new series of banknotes on 18 August 2022. Officially, they were retroactively issued as legal tender on 17 August 2022 to commemorate Indonesia's 77th year of independence. Similar to the 2016 series, the Indonesian dances and national heroes are still featured on the notes, with some notable changes.

Commemorative banknotes

Suharto "25 years of development" commemorative Rp50,000 polymer note (1993)
In 1993, a polymer Rp50,000 rupiah (approximately US$22) note celebrating "25 Years of Development" with the hologram and phrase "Penerbitan Khusus" (Special Issue) was issued. Only five million notes are printed and each were packed in a presentation pack explaining the 25-year growth plan since 1969. These notes were priced at Rp100,000 upon release, which was double the face value. The design featured Suharto on the front and Soekarno-Hatta airport on the back, with a plane taking off to symbolise Indonesia's growth. However, it is believed that due to poor sales, some of the polymer notes, minus the folder, were issued as regularly circulating money. A paper version (regular note) of similar design was printed in 1993 and 1994.

75th anniversary of independence Rp75,000 note (2020) 
Bank Indonesia officially introduced a new commemorative banknote on 17 August 2020 to commemorate the 75th anniversary of Indonesia's declaration of independence. It was the first commemorative money to independence anniversary in banknotes, after before issued in coins. A total of 75 million notes were printed. They were made available to Indonesian citizens over the age of 17, who could purchase a maximum of one banknote by registering online and collecting it at one of the 45 regional Bank Indonesia branches. Due to the high demand, banknotes were subsequently offered for sale online for prices up to Rp8.8 million, more than 117 times its face value. Following rumors that the notes were only merchandise, and not legal tender, the central bank confirmed they could be used for payment transactions. The design of the note also attracted attention, and Bank Indonesia was obliged to deny that one of the children pictured on the back was wearing a traditional costume from China.

Counterfeit warnings 
Until 1999, rupiah banknotes featured a line of text warning people of the legal consequences faced if they counterfeit money.

1945-1947: Barangsiapa yang meniru atau memalsu uang kertas negara, atau dengan sengaja mengedarkan, menyimpan ataupun memasukkan kedaerah Republik Indonesia uang kertas tiruan atau palsu, dapat dihukum menurut Kitab Undang-undang Hukum Pidana pasal 244, 245 dan 249. (Anyone who imitates or counterfeits banknotes of the state, or deliberately circulates, stores or imports counterfeit banknotes to the territory of the Republic of Indonesia, can be punished according to the Criminal Code articles 244, 245 and 249.)
1947 (on Dutch-issued banknotes): Di dalam pasal 244, 245 dan 249 dari Kitab Undang-undang Hukuman ditetapkan hukuman untuk yang meniru atau memalsukan uang kertas dan untuk yang mengeluarkan dengan sengaja, menyimpan atau memasukkan uang kertas palsu atau yang dijadikan palsu ke Hindia Belanda. (In articles 244, 245 and 249 of the Criminal Code, penalties are stipulated for those who imitate or falsify banknotes and for those who deliberately issue, store or import counterfeit banknotes or those made to be counterfeit into the Dutch East Indies.)
1947-1979: Barangsiapa meniru atau memalsukan uang kertas dan barangsiapa mengeluarkan dengan sengaja atau menyimpan uang kertas tiruan atau uang kertas yang dipalsukan akan dituntut dimuka hakim. (Whoever imitates or falsifies banknotes and whoever issues or keeps imitation or falsified banknotes on purpose will be prosecuted before a judge.) On some banknotes, this warning is repeated multiple times, mostly twice.
1979-1999: Barangsiapa meniru, memalsukan uang kertas dan/atau dengan sengaja menyimpan serta mengedarkan uang kertas tiruan atau uang kertas palsu diancam dengan hukuman penjara. (Anyone who imitates, falsifies banknotes and/or deliberately stores and distributes imitation or counterfeit banknotes is threatened with imprisonment.)

Security features 

 The banknotes are made of cotton fibres, because they are more flexible and not easily ripped. However, the actual material used is the abacá fibre, which is naturally plentiful in Indonesia (especially on the Talaud Islands) and is believed to increase the durability of the banknotes. In 2014, Bank Indonesia plan to use these materials, but in 2016 edition, they prefer to print using paper which was also used to print banknotes from previous editions.
 The minimum security features for naked eyes are watermarks, electrotypes and security threads with colour fibres. In addition to this, extra features may be included, such as holograms, Irisafe, iridescent stripes, clear windows, metameric windows and gold patches.
 Watermark and electrotype are made by controlling the gap of density of the fibres which create certain images for the banknotes. This is done to raise the quality of the notes from the aesthetic view.
 Security threads are put in the middle of the note's materials so horizontal and vertical lines are shown from top to bottom. The threads also can be made with many variations such as the materials, size, colour and design.
 The 2004 and 2005 note series of Rp10,000, Rp20,000, Rp50,000 and Rp100,000 rupiah, which was revised in 2010 and 2011, introduced several new security features: use of EURion constellation rings, rainbow printing designed to change colour when viewed from different angles, and tactile features for blind people and those with visual difficulties to recognise the different denominations stated on the notes.

Notes

References